This is a list of diseases of foliage plants belonging to the family Araliaceae that occur in the United States.

Plant species

Bacterial diseases

Fungal diseases

References
Common Names of Diseases, The American Phytopathological Society

Foliage plant (Araliaceae)